The cheekspot blenny (Parablennius opercularis) is a species of combtooth blenny found in the western Indian Ocean, in the Persian Gulf, Gulf of Oman and adjacent parts of the Indian Ocean.  This species reaches a length of from  TL.

References

cheekspot blenny
Fish of the Indian Ocean
Fish of the Persian Gulf
Tropical fish
cheekspot blenny
Taxa named by James A. Murray (zoologist)